Amarelis Yorlene De Mera Lasso (born 28 March 1985) is a Panamanian footballer and coach who plays as a forward for Israeli club Hapoel Marmorek Rehovot and the Panama women's national team. She played for the American team, Santa Clarita Blue Heat, in the USL W-League.

See also
 List of Panama women's international footballers

References

External links 

 
 

1985 births
Living people
Sportspeople from Panama City
Panamanian women's footballers
Women's association football forwards
UE L'Estartit players
USL W-League (1995–2015) players
Ligat Nashim players
Panama women's international footballers
Panamanian expatriate women's footballers
Panamanian expatriate sportspeople in Spain
Expatriate women's footballers in Spain
Panamanian expatriate sportspeople in the United States
Expatriate women's soccer players in the United States
Panamanian expatriate sportspeople in Israel
Expatriate women's footballers in Israel
Panamanian football managers
Female association football managers